Florian may refer to:

People
 Florian (name), including a list of people and fictional characters with the given name or surname
 Florian, Roman emperor in 276 AD
 Saint Florian (250 – c. 304 AD), patron saint of Poland and Upper Austria, also of the cities of Kraków, Poland; Linz, Austria; firefighters, chimney sweeps and soapmakers

Other uses
 Florian, Minnesota, a place in the U.S.
 Florian (film), a 1940 American romantic comedy
 Florian (1938 film), a Polish film of the 1930s
 Florians, a religious order
 Caffè Florian, a coffee house in Venice
 Isuzu Florian, a car

See also

Sankt Florian (disambiguation)
 Florianópolis, a city in Brazil, capital of the state of Santa Catarina